

Events

Works published

Births
 Trần Nhân Tông (died 1308), Vietnamese third emperor of the Trần dynasty who was also a prolific writer and poet

Deaths
 Baha' al-din Zuhair (born 1186), Arabian poet
 Shang Dao (born 1193), Chinese Sanqu poet

13th-century poetry
Poetry